The Russian Curling Championships are annual national curling tournaments held in Russia between various Russian curling clubs. The national championships were introduced during the 1992–93 season, after the Russian Curling Federation was formed the previous year. The championships are played over a season from winter to spring.

Champions

* Skip

All time medals
As of the conclusion of the 2022 Russian Women's Curling Championship

References

External links
Curling in Russia  (web archive)
Russian Curling Federation 

Curling competitions in Russia
National curling championships
National championships in Russia
Recurring sporting events established in 1992
1992 establishments in Russia